The 2015 Kazan Kremlin Cup was a professional tennis tournament played on hard courts. It was the sixth edition of the tournament which was part of the 2015 ATP Challenger Tour. It took place in Kazan, Russia between 16 and 22 March 2015.

Singles main draw entrants

Seeds

 1 Rankings are as of March 9, 2015

Other entrants
The following players received wildcards into the singles main draw:
  Vitaly Kozyukov
  Timur Kiuamov
  Karen Khachanov
  Evgeny Elistratov

The following players received entry from the qualifying draw:
  Laurynas Grigelis
  Adrian Sikora
  Sergey Betov
  Mikhail Elgin

Champions

Singles

 Aslan Karatsev def.  Konstantin Kravchuk, 6–4, 4–6, 6–3

Doubles

 Mikhail Elgin /  Igor Zelenay def.  Andrea Arnaboldi /  Matteo Viola, 6–3, 6–3

References
 Singles Main Draw

2015 ATP Challenger Tour
2015
2015 Kazan Kremlin Cup
2015 in Russian tennis
March 2015 sports events in Russia